Poof is a pejorative term for a homosexual man.

Poof may also refer to:

 Baby Poof, a character in the American animated series The Fairly OddParents
 Yarael Poof, a character in the Star Wars franchise
 Poofer, a fictional elf in Wee Sing: The Best Christmas Ever

See also
Pouf, a hairstyle
Pouffe (also spelled pouf), a hassock or stool